Haffon (1695–1727) was the last ruler of the Kingdom of Whydah before it was captured by the forces of Dahomey in 1727.

Born in 1695, Haffon became King of Whydah in 1708.  He was not crowned in a formal ceremony at Savi until April 1725.  His coronation party included 40 of his favorite wives.  The 1725 date is that given by Chevalier des Marchais but some modern scholars argue it happened in 1717-1718.

References
Harms, Robert. The Diligent: A Voyage Through the Worlds of the Slave Trade. Basic Books: New York, 2002. p. 152-155.

African kings
1695 births
18th-century rulers in Africa
1727 deaths
History of Benin